Broadmeadows is a name given to various locations and their associated facilities around the English-speaking world.

It can refer to:

Places and their facilities

Australia
 Broadmeadows, a suburb of Melbourne
 Broadmeadows railway station, Melbourne
 Broadmeadows Bus Service
 Broadmeadows Central
 Broadmeadows Assembly Plant, a former motor vehicle factory
 Broadmeadows Valley Trail, a shared use path
 Broadmeadows, Tasmania, a locality
 Broadmeadows railway station, Adelaide

United Kingdom
 Broadmeadows, Scottish Borders, a village in Scotland

New Zealand
 Broadmeadows, New Zealand, a suburb of Wellington

See also
 Broadmeadow, New South Wales, a suburb of Newcastle